Mutai is a surname of Kenyan origin. A multilingual name, it is found among the kalenjin, meru, kikuyu with an additional letter "h". It may refer to:

 Abel Mutai (born 1988), Kenyan steeplechase runner and 2012 Olympic medallist
 Emmanuel Kipchirchir Mutai (born 1984), Kenyan marathon runner and 2011 London Marathon winner
 Geoffrey Mutai (born 1981), Kenyan marathon runner, winner of the Boston Marathon and New York Marathon
 Mark Mutai (born 1978), Kenyan 400 metres sprinter and 2010 Commonwealth Games champion
 Shunsuke Mutai (born 1956), Japanese politician of the Liberal Democratic Party

See also
Kimutai, meaning "son of Mutai"
Kinamutay, subtype of Filipino martial arts

Kenyan names